The Good Wife is an upcoming Indian legal and political drama streaming television series on Disney+ Hotstar. It is an adaptation of Robert King and Michelle King's The Good Wife, being directed by Suparn Verma and featuring Kajol in the lead role. The series is centered on a housewife who, after 13 years, returns to work at a law firm to support her family when her husband gets imprisoned.

The series was announced in July 2022 with the principal photography commencing a month later, in August.

Cast 

 Kajol
 Kubbra Sait
 Sheeba Chaddha
 Aamir Ali
 Alyy Khan
 Vijay Vikram Singh
 Swayam Joshi
 Haelyn Shastri
 Sheena Chohan
 Nirbhay Jain

Production

Development 
A collaboration between Disney+ Hotstar and Kajol was announced in July 2022 with a teaser video revealing an untitled series. In August, the first schedule of the shooting commenced at Juhu Studios in Mumbai where a set was built depicting an office setting. On 8 September 2022, the first look was released, announcing the title as well as the show being an adaptation of the American series of the same name.

References

External links 
 The Good Wife at IMDb

Hindi-language Disney+ Hotstar original programming
Upcoming television series
Indian legal television series
Indian television series based on American television series
The Good Wife